Persicoptila anthophyes is a moth in the family Cosmopterigidae. It is found in Australia, where it has been recorded from Queensland.

References

Natural History Museum Lepidoptera generic names catalog

Cosmopteriginae
Moths described in 1926